The following highways are numbered 362:

Canada
 Manitoba Provincial Road 362
 Newfoundland and Labrador Route 362
 Nova Scotia Route 362
 Quebec Route 362
 Saskatchewan Highway 362

Japan
 Japan National Route 362

United States
  Arkansas Highway 362
  Georgia State Route 362
  Indiana State Road 362
  Kentucky Route 362
  Maryland Route 362
  Nevada State Route 362 (unsigned designation for U.S. Route 95 Truck)
 New York:
  New York State Route 362
 County Route 362 (Albany County, New York)
  Ohio State Route 362
  Pennsylvania Route 362
  Puerto Rico Highway 362
  Tennessee State Route 362
  Texas State Highway 362 (former)
  Virginia State Route 362